Kate Kelly (born February 24, 1975) is an American reporter for The New York Times.

Biography
Kelly was raised in Washington, D.C. She is a graduate of the National Cathedral School after which she attended Columbia University where she received a B.A. in History in 1997. After school, she worked for Time magazine and the New York Observer  where she wrote a weekly residential real-estate column, "Manhattan Transfers." she then worked for The Wall Street Journal for ten years as an investigative journalist and then in 2010 she was hired by CNBC as an on-air reporter. In 2016, she was hired by The New York Times as their business reporter.

Kelly is also the author, with Robin Pogrebin, of The Education of Brett Kavanaugh: An Investigation with a publishing date in September 2019 from Portfolio Books, a division of Penguin Random House. Before publication, the Times published a widely criticised essay adapted from the book that primarily addressed accusations about an incident with Deborah Ramirez and another incident alleged by Max Stier, both of which occurred at Yale. Before Kavanaugh's confirmation in October, 2018, Pogrebin, also at the Times and a classmate of Kavanaugh at Yale, and Kelly, were featured in a podcast about what the then-judge's classmates were saying concerning his nomination to the Supreme Court.

Personal life
Kelly is married to editor Kyle Pope; she has three daughters.

Awards
 2004 Gerald Loeb Award for Deadline Writing
 2008 Gerald Loeb Award for Beat Writing
 2009 Livingston Award for Excellence in National Reporting

References

The New York Times writers
Living people
20th-century American journalists
Columbia College (New York) alumni
The Wall Street Journal people
CNBC people
The New York Observer people
Time (magazine) people
21st-century American journalists
American women journalists
20th-century American women writers
21st-century American women writers
1975 births
Journalists from Washington, D.C.
Gerald Loeb Award winners for Deadline and Beat Reporting
Livingston Award winners for National Reporting